Sepiadarium kochi, common name tropical bottletail squid or Koch's bottletail squid, is a species of cuttlefish.

Description
This species grows to a maximum mantle length of approximately 3 cm.

Distribution
Sepiadarium kochi is found in the Indo-West Pacific from India to Japan, and throughout the Indo-Malayan region.

Habitat
This species is a demersal animal, and has been found living at a depth of 60 m.

References

External links
 Lizard Island Field Guide - Tropical Bottletail Squid

Cuttlefish
Cephalopods described in 1881